The Mali national women's cricket team is the team that represents Mali in international women's cricket. In April 2018, the International Cricket Council (ICC) granted full Women's Twenty20 International (WT20I) status to all its members. Therefore, all Twenty20 matches played between Mali women and other ICC members after 1 July 2018 are full WT20I matches.

Mali participated in the inaugural 2015 North West Africa Cricket Council (NWACC) women's tournament held in the Gambia. The team finished fourth behind Sierra Leone, Gambia, and Ghana.

The team was one of four sides to play in the 2019 Kwibuka Women's T20 Tournament at the Gahanga International Cricket Stadium in Rwanda. On 18 June 2019, in their opening match, against hosts Rwanda women, the team was bowled out for just six runs in nine overs. Only one cricketer for Mali, Mariam Samake, scored a run in the match, with nine other players dismissed for a duck. It was the first time an innings of an international cricket match had nine ducks on the scorecard. Rwanda women chased down the target of seven runs to win in four balls, to win the match by ten wickets. It was the lowest team total in a completed WT20I match.

In their next two matches of the tournament, against Tanzania and Uganda, the team were bowled out for eleven and ten runs respectively. Therefore, Mali recorded the three lowest totals in WT20Is in their first three matches on three consecutive days. Uganda scored 314 runs from their twenty overs, recording the highest total in a WT20I match. Mali lost the match by 304 runs, the biggest margin of defeat by runs in a WT20I fixture. Mali went on to lose all of their matches in the tournament, finishing with totals of 6, 11, 10, 30/9, 17 and 14 from the six matches they played. Following the conclusion of the tournament, some cricket statisticians questioned the ICC's decision to grant full international status to all of its matches.

Records and statistics
International Match Summary — Mali Women
 
Last Updated 23 June 2019

Twenty20 International
T20I record versus other nations 

Records complete to WT20I #678. Last updated 23 June 2019.

See also
 List of Mali women Twenty20 International cricketers

References

 
Women's
Women's national cricket teams